The 1958–59 Serie C was the twenty-first edition of Serie C, the third highest league in the Italian football league system.
There were no relegations in order to expand the league to three groups. The expansion was decided by the FIGC.

Girone A

Final classification

Promotion tie-breaker

Ozo Mantova promoted to Serie B.

Girone B

Final classification

References

External links
Italy 1958/59 at RSSSF

Serie C seasons
3
Italy